Ditz may refer to:

Nancy Ditz (born 1954), former American long-distance runner
John Ditz, former NASCAR Grand National Series car owner
Ditz (Fils), a river of Baden-Württemberg, Germany, tributary of the Fils
Ditz (band), an English rock band from Brighton
A scatterbrained person, especially a woman

See also
 Dit (disambiguation)